"The Ties That Bind" is a song written by Clyde Otis and Vin Corso, and recorded by American country music artist Don Williams. It was released in December 1974 as the second and final single from the album Don Williams Vol. III.  The song reached number 4 on the Billboard Hot Country Singles & Tracks chart and number 2 on the Canadian RPM Country Tracks chart.

Charts

Weekly charts

Year-end charts

References

1974 singles
Don Williams songs
Songs written by Clyde Otis
ABC Records singles
Dot Records singles
1974 songs